A Moving Picture is the second studio album released by English rapper Devlin, via Island Records and the Universal Music Group. The album was released on 4 February 2013. The album was produced by a number of well known producers, including Labrinth, Kraze, Lewi White, TMS, Future Cut and Naughty Boy. Featured guests on the album include Katy B, Ed Sheeran, Wretch 32, Diane Birch, Etta Bond and Chasing Grace.

Background
Devlin stated in an interview with Digital Spy that the standard version of the album will contain between sixteen and eighteen tracks, and that the deluxe edition could contain up to twenty-two. A total of twenty four tracks have been recorded for possible inclusion on the album. An exclusive version of the album will be available to purchase through Devlin's official website. This version of the album includes a DVD which contains an exclusive documentary on the making of the album, and an extended version of the 'Watchtower' music video, made into a short film. The short film features appearances from Jaime Winstone, Neil Maskell, Tilly Vosburgh, and George Russo, in a cinematic thriller with Devlin and Ed Sheeran in the lead roles. This version of the album will also come with an exclusive poster.

Critical reception
A Moving Picture received generally mixed reviews from music critics. At Metacritic, which assigns a normalized rating out of 100 to reviews from mainstream critics, the album received an average score of 51, based on nine reviews.

Jan Mulder of Amazon.co.uk awarded the album five out of five stars, and said the following of the album: "Album opener 'Sun Goes Down' is a strong musically layered anthem, making use of the eerie, yet sophisticated hook from Katy B to the best possible advantage, and the addition of some lyrically mastered verses to the mix cement this as the album's finest opener. 'Watchtower' really lends highly upon the fantastic bass line and sensitivity of Ed Sheeran's voice, linking up the fantastic hook with a powerful instrumental arrangement. Wretch 32 hook up 'Off With Their Heads' is a clustered arrangement of in and out verses from Devlin and Wretch, and is one of the album's darker highlights. 'Rewind' sticks out like a sore thumb on the album, as it's the most mainstream style track Devlin has ever written and released. However, despite that, the track is so musically pleasing in its own right that it deserves a place amongst the highest of rap masterpieces, and proves that Devlin can take on any musical challenge and win. And to close, 'The Cast' is an ideal opener for the next horror slasher to grace our screens, and 'The Garden', which picks a classic beat, add some bars overtop, mixes it a little bit at the end, and creates the perfect swansong for another classic British album. Devlin keeps it flowing from the start to the end, and the album doesn't disappoint."

Robert Corpsey of Digital Spy awarded the album three out of five stars, and said the following of the album: "Opener 'Sun Goes Down' picks up where Devlin left off and magnifies it x10, employing weighty beats and a haunting string section to match angry verses that are instantly lifted by the Katy B-assisted chorus. The aggression that made his debut so fascinating rears its head again on 'Off With Their Heads' and closer 'The Garden', the latter a razor-sharp, chorus-less affair where he sounds at his most comfortable. Frustratingly, it's the set's more chart-friendly cuts that let it down. The trancey bleeps on 'Love Cards' and watery production on his latest single 'Rewind' make him sound like an artist that's trying to fit in rather than stand out."

Singles
"Watchtower" was released on 20 August 2012, as the lead single from the album. The track features vocals from Ed Sheeran, was produced by Labrinth and features a sample of the original version, recorded by Bob Dylan. The music video was recorded in the form of a short film, with edited versions being used for television airplay. It peaked at #7 on the UK Singles Chart, becoming Devlin's most successful single to date. "Off With Their Heads" was released on 10 October 2012, as the second single from the album. The track features vocals from fellow rapper Wretch 32, and was released shortly after its premiere on BBC Radio 1 Xtra. The music video features Devlin and Wretch performing the track in a deserted underground warehouse. It peaked at #62 on the UK Singles Chart. "Rewind" was released a week prior to the album, on 28 January 2013. The track samples the original version of the track, and features vocals from the original artist, Diane Birch. It was originally due for release on 22 October 2012, but was delayed as the album was also pushed back until 2013. Devlin premiered the song during his gig as part of the BBC Radio 1Xtra festival during the first week of November 2012.

Track listing

Charts

Release history

References

Devlin (rapper) albums
2013 albums
Island Records albums
Albums produced by Naughty Boy
Albums produced by Labrinth
Albums produced by Ant Whiting
Albums produced by TMS (production team)